The 2018 Florida Tech Panthers football team represents Florida Institute of Technology (FIT) during the 2018 NCAA Division II football season. They are led by sixth-year head coach Steve Englehart. The Panthers played their home games at Florida Tech Panther Stadium, approximately one mile from the Florida Tech campus, and are members of the Gulf South Conference.

The 2018 season saw FIT finish with a record of 8-4, earning their second trip to the NCAA Division II Football Championship where they were eliminated in the first round at Lenoir-Rhyne. The Panthers finished with a record of 5-3 in GSC play, including their first ever win over in-state rival West Florida with a 30-28 victory in Pensacola that saw them record the largest comeback in program history after trailing by 18 points in the first half.

Preseason

Gulf South Conference coaches poll
On August 2, 2018, the Gulf South Conference released their preseason coaches poll with the Panthers predicted to finish in 6th place in the conference.

Preseason All-Gulf South Conference Team
The Panthers had four players at four positions selected to the preseason all-Gulf South Conference team.

Offense

Romell Guerrier – WR

Antwuan Haynes – RB

Defense

Adonis Davis – DL

J. T. Hassell – LB

Schedule
Florida Tech 2018 football schedule consists of five home and six away games in the regular season. The Panthers will host GSC foes Delta State, Mississippi College, North Greenville, and Valdosta State, and will travel to Shorter, West Alabama, West Florida, and West Georgia.

The Panthers will host one of the three non-conference games against Newberry from the South Atlantic Conference (SAC) and will travel to Benedict from the Southern Intercollegiate Athletic Conference and Wingate also from the SAC.

Two of the eleven games will be broadcast on ESPN3, as part of the Gulf South Conference Game of the Week.

Schedule Source:

Rankings

Game summaries

at Benedict

Newberry

Delta State

at West Georgia

at Wingate

Mississippi College

Valdosta State

at West Florida

at West Alabama

North Greenville

at Shorter

at Lenoir-Rhyne

Awards and milestones

Gulf South Conference honors

Four players from Florida Tech were honored as All-GSC selections by the league's coaches. Linebacker J.T. Hassell was named the GSC Defensive Player of the Year, becoming the second Panther to receive the honor.

Gulf South Conference Defensive Player of the Year: J.T. Hassell

Gulf South Conference All-Conference First Team

J.T. Hassell, LB
Adonis Davis, DL
Romell Guerrier, WR

Gulf South Conference All-Conference Second Team

Antwuan Haynes, RB

Gulf South Conference offensive player of the week
October 22: Romell Guerrier

Gulf South Conference defensive player of the week
September 10: J.T. Hassell 
October 1: J.T. Hassell 
October 29: J.T. Hassell 
November 5: Dezmond Morgan

Gulf South Conference special teams player of the week
November 5: Trey Schaneville

School records
Most career rushing yards: 3,496, Antwuan Haynes
Most career rushing touchdowns: 25, Antwuan Haynes
Most career sacks: 23, Adonis Davis
Most career tackles for loss: 52, Adonis Davis
Most touchdown receptions in a season: 13, Romell Guerrier
Most tackles in a season: 124, J.T. Hassell
Most interceptions in a season: 4, John McClure
Most defensive touchdowns in a season: 3, Richard Leveille
Most tackles in a game: 20, J.T. Hassell (October 6, 2018)
Most sacks in a single game: 4, J.T. Hassell (September 29, 2018)
T-Most interceptions in a single game: 2, Dezmond Morgan (November 3, 2018) and John McClure (September 1, 2018)
T-Most tackles for loss in a single game: 4, J.T. Hassell (September 29, 2018)
Most carries in a single game: 29, Antwuan Haynes (October 20, 2018)
Largest comeback: 18 at West Florida (October 20, 2018)
 Most points scored in single game: 55 at Shorter (November 10, 2018)

References

Florida Tech
Florida Tech Panthers football seasons
Florida Tech Panthers football